Greatest Hits Volume 2 is a greatest hits compilation album by The Beatles that was exclusive to Australia.  The album was compiled by EMI Australia to fill in the gap between Revolver and Sgt. Pepper's Lonely Hearts Club Band.

Background and stereo mixes

The compilation and its predecessor were both originally conceived in early 1966, when EMI Australia requested stereo tapes from their UK branch for tracks not already in the Australian vaults.  This meant the album contains the original 1965 stereo mixes of "Day Tripper" and "We Can Work It Out" rather than the new stereo mixes created for the late-1966 compilation album A Collection of Beatles Oldies.

The compilation was the only album release worldwide of the original stereo mix of "She's a Woman" until The Beatles Box in 1980 and the Past Masters collection in 1988.

Release, sales and deletion

The album was pressed and distributed through Australia by EMI Australia and through Southeast Asia (Singapore, Malaysia and Hong Kong) by EMI (SEA). By mid-1973, both volumes of the compilation had sold over 100,000 in Australia.

In 1973, both volumes of the album were repackaged as a double album by EMI Australia to commemorate the 10th anniversary of the Beatles first single in Australia.  The release was titled The Beatles Australian 10th Anniversary 1963-1973 Souvenir Presentation - The Beatels' Greatest Hits Volumes 1 and 2.  Eight different Australian radio stations promoted the album by featuring their logo on eight different stickers.  This edition of the albums was only available for a few months before it was quietly deleted.

Both volumes stayed in print in Australia until EMI Australia ceased vinyl production in 1991.  The album was released on cassette but never released a compact disc.

Track listing

References

External links
 Fixing a hole - the great lost Aussie Beatles collection
  The Usenet Guide to Beatles Recording Variations

Albums produced by George Martin
The Beatles compilation albums
1966 greatest hits albums
Soundtrack compilation albums
Parlophone compilation albums
Albums arranged by George Martin